Destination Gobi is a 1953 American Technicolor World War II film released by 20th Century-Fox. It was produced by Stanley Rubin, directed by Robert Wise (his first color feature film) and stars Richard Widmark and Don Taylor.

U.S. Navy chief Sam McHale takes command of a unit of weather observers stranded behind Japanese lines deep in Inner Mongolia. McHale must lead his men across the treacherous Gobi Desert to the sea coast. Mongols whom the sailors had befriended, led by chief Tengu, help them elude the Japanese and steal a Chinese junk in order to reach Okinawa.

After the picture's opening credits, a written foreword reads:In the Navy records in Washington, there is an obscure entry reading "Saddles for Gobi." This film is based on the story behind that entry - one of the strangest stories of World War II.

The unit involved was part of the Sino-American Cooperative Organization (SACO), referred to as Sino-American Combined Operations in the film.

Actor Ernest Borgnine has stated in interviews that he believed that this film, and Widmark's role of CPO Sam McHale, were the basis of the role of Quentin McHale in the television show McHale's Navy.

Plot
A Navy unit operates a weather station in the Gobi Desert during World War II. The group's ramrod is CPO Sam McHale, a tough efficiency expert and a fish-out-of-water in the Gobi, having served years at sea. One evening, Mongolian nomads led by Kengtu set up camp at the station's oasis. Despite cultural differences, the two groups settle into uneasy co-existence. Seaman Jenkins, an ex-cowboy, muses that the Mongols would make an excellent cavalry troop. Hoping to persuade the Mongols to join them against the Japanese, McHale requisitions 60 Army-issue saddles. They soon arrive and the Mongols appear delighted. Later, however, Japanese planes bomb and strafe the camp, killing Wyatt and several Mongols. When the surviving nomads abandon the camp, the Americans, lonely and defenseless, evacuate 800 miles to the sea.

McHale and the men reach an oasis where Chinese traders are camped. There, they encounter Kengtu, who explains he abandoned the station to protect his people from the "birds in the sky." Telling McHale his followers desire the return of their saddles, Kengtu offers to escort the Americans to the sea if they disguise themselves in native garb. All goes well until they reach the Japanese-occupied city of Sangchien, China, where Kengtu leads McHale's unit into a trap set by Japanese soldiers, who transport them to a prisoner-of-war camp on the coast. There, they are held as spies.

However, one of Kengtu's men, Wali-Akhun, allows himself to be arrested while wearing a stolen American uniform. Wali reveals to McHale and his men that Kengtu has arranged for their escape. That night, they break out and head for the docks, where Kengtu is waiting with a Chinese junk. The wily Kengtu explains to McHale that their capture was a ploy to trick the Japanese into transporting them to the ocean. They set sail for Okinawa and are later spotted by American planes. The men are rescued, McHale is awarded the Navy Cross, and Kengtu and Wali are returned to their people, along with 60 new saddle blankets.

Cast

 Richard Widmark as CPO Samuel T. McHale  
 Don Taylor as Jenkins  
 Casey Adams as Walter Landers  
 Murvyn Vye as Kengtu  
 Darryl Hickman as Wilbur 'Coney' Cohen
 Earl Holliman as Frank Swenson 
 Martin Milner as Elwood Halsey  
 Ross Bagdasarian Sr. (credited as Ross Bagdasarian) as Paul Sabatello  
 Judy Dan as Nura-Salu (as Judy Dann)  
 Rodolfo Acosta as Tomec  
 Russell Collins as Lt. Cmdr. Hobart Wyatt  
 Leonard Strong as Wali-Akhun

References

External links
 
 
 
 
 Marine Gazette history of navy and marines in China under SACO during WW2

1953 films
1953 war films
American World War II films
Films set in Mongolia
Films set in deserts
Gobi Desert
Films directed by Robert Wise
20th Century Fox films
Films set in 1944
Films about the United States Navy in World War II
Films scored by Sol Kaplan
Second Sino-Japanese War films
American war films
World War II films based on actual events
1950s English-language films
1950s American films